Thelymitra peniculata, commonly called the trim sun orchid, is a species of orchid that is endemic to southern eastern Australia. It has a single long, erect, fleshy, channelled leaf and up to eighteen deep blue to purple self-pollinating flowers.

Description
The lobe on the top of the anther is dark brown to blackish with a yellow tip, tubular and sharply curved with a notched tip. The side lobes curve upwards and have untidy, mop-like tufts of white hairs. Flowering occurs from September to November but the flowers are self-pollinating and only open on hot days.

Taxonomy and naming
Thelymitra peniculata was first formally described in 2004 by Jeff Jeanes. The description was published in Muelleria from a specimen collected near Narrandera. The specific epithet (peniculata) is derived from the Latin word peniculus meaning "brush" referring to the loose, semi-erect tuft of hairs on the lateral lobes.

Distribution and habitat
The trim sun orchid usually grows in a range of habitats from grassland to forest south from Mount Kaputar in New South Wales to the Australian Capital Territory, Victoria, Tasmania and the Flinders Ranges in South Australia.

References

External links
 
 

peniculata
Endemic orchids of Australia
Orchids of Victoria (Australia)
Orchids of New South Wales
Orchids of the Australian Capital Territory
Orchids of South Australia
Orchids of Tasmania
Plants described in 2004